The 2015 Malabar Premier League season was the first ever season of the Malabar Premier League, the football league for the Malabar region of the Indian state of Kerala. The league kicked off on 7 April 2015.

Teams

Matches

Semi-Finals

Final

References

External links
 Official website
 Malabar Premier League to kickoff on April 11.

Malabar Premier League
Mara